The Marriage of Mr. Mississippi is a 1961 Swiss-West German comedy film directed by Kurt Hoffmann and starring O.E. Hasse, Johanna von Koczian and Martin Held. It is based on the 1952 play with the same title by Friedrich Dürrenmatt. It was entered into the 11th Berlin International Film Festival. The film was shot at the Spandau Studios in Berlin, and on location in Zurich. The sets were designed by the art directors Hertha Hareiter and Otto Pischinger.

Cast
 O.E. Hasse as Florestan Mississippi
 Johanna von Koczian as Anastasia
 Hansjörg Felmy as Graf Bodo von Überlohe-Zabernsee
 Martin Held as Frédéric René Saint-Claude
 Charles Régnier as Sir Thomas Jones - Justizminister
 Max Haufler as Van Bosch
 Ruedi Walter as McGoy
 Karl Lieffen as Santamaria
 Hanns Ernst Jäger as Schlender
 Edith Hancke as Lukretia
 Otto Graf as Ministerpräsident
 Tilo von Berlepsch as Außenminister
 Kunibert Gensichen as Informationsminister
 Herbert Weissbach as Finanzminister

References

Bibliography

External links

1961 films
1961 comedy films
German comedy films
1960s German-language films
German black-and-white films
German films based on plays
Swiss comedy films
West German films
Swiss black-and-white films
Films based on works by Friedrich Dürrenmatt
Films directed by Kurt Hoffmann
Films set in Europe
UFA GmbH films
Films shot at Spandau Studios
1960s German films